The Omaha River is a river of the Auckland Region of New Zealand's North Island.

See also
List of rivers of New Zealand

References

Rivers of the Auckland Region
Hauraki Gulf catchment